Johannes van Genk (born 9 Sep 1803 in Princenhage) was a Dutch clergyman and bishop for the Roman Catholic Diocese of Breda. He was ordained in 1827. He was appointed in 1868. He died in 1874.

References 

Dutch Roman Catholic bishops
1803 births
1874 deaths